In enzymology, an O-acetylhomoserine aminocarboxypropyltransferase is an enzyme that catalyzes the chemical reaction

O-acetyl-L-homoserine + methanethiol  L-methionine + acetate

Thus, the two substrates of this enzyme are O-acetyl-L-homoserine and methanethiol, whereas its two products are L-methyionine and acetate.

This enzyme belongs to the family of transferases, specifically those transferring aryl or alkyl groups other than methyl groups.  The systematic name of this enzyme class is ''O-acetyl-L-homoserine:methanethiol 3-amino-3-carboxypropyltransferase. Other names in common use include O-acetyl-L-homoserine acetate-lyase (adding methanethiol), O-acetyl-L-homoserine sulfhydrolase, O-acetylhomoserine (thiol)-lyase, O''-acetylhomoserine sulfhydrolase, and methionine synthase.  This enzyme participates in methionine metabolism and cysteine metabolism.

References

 
 
 
 
 
 
 

EC 2.5.1
Enzymes of unknown structure